Wipper-Eine was a Verwaltungsgemeinschaft ("collective municipality") in the Mansfeld-Südharz district, in Saxony-Anhalt, Germany. It was situated between Hettstedt and Aschersleben. It was named after the river Wipper and its tributary Eine. The seat of the Verwaltungsgemeinschaft was in Quenstedt. It was disbanded on 1 January 2010.

The Verwaltungsgemeinschaft Wipper-Eine consisted of the following municipalities:

Former Verwaltungsgemeinschaften in Saxony-Anhalt